Michel Muschs (born 30 May 1940) is a Belgian former field hockey player. He competed at the 1960 Summer Olympics and the 1964 Summer Olympics.

References

External links
 

1940 births
Living people
Belgian male field hockey players
Olympic field hockey players of Belgium
Field hockey players at the 1960 Summer Olympics
Field hockey players at the 1964 Summer Olympics
People from Uccle
Field hockey players from Brussels